Lev Blatný  (11 April 1894 Brno – 21 June 1930  Poprad-Kvetnica) was a Czech poet, author, theatre critic and dramaturg.

Life
Blatný descended from a musical family from Brno. From 1915 to 1918 he was a soldier in Galicia, in the Bukovina and Albania. After the war he terminated his studies in Prague and became a civil servant at Československé státní dráhy (Czechoslovak State Railways) in Brno. Shortly thereafter he began his theatre activity, first as Dramaturg. He tried to bring important new works native and strange artists on the stage.

Works
Already as a young man he published poems and short prose, later the theatre was his homeland,  he wrote also numerous criticisms. His first own work was Starlit Sky (Hvězdná obloha), specified in the theatre in Brno. The play Three (Tři) and the comedy followed Kokoko dák, were his most popular works. He wrote also some Expressionist stories. He died of tuberculosis.

References

Czech poets
Czech male poets
1894 births
1930 deaths
20th-century Czech poets
20th-century male writers
Writers from Brno